Katie Savannah Steele (born December 29, 1992) is an American model rocketeer. She is actively involved in National Association of Rocketry. She has been featured in several magazines, including Sport Rocketry. Her notable works include three separate national championships at the National Association of Rocketry's Annual Meet (2006, 2008, 2010). She is known for competing on the United States team in the World Space Modeling Championships in Serbia in 2010 and acting as assistant team manager of United States junior team in World Space Modeling Championships in Liptovský Mikuláš Slovakia in 2012 and at the European Spacemodeling Championships in Shumen, Bulgaria in 2013 and Lviv, Ukraine in 2015. Steele and her two sisters, Caroline, and Cassidy have also competed as a team at the Team America Rocketry Challenge (2010). The Steele family has been involved with model rocketry since 2004.

Steele and her sisters have been one of the factors within the field of hobby model rocketry to help create a new, young female influence within the hobby itself, which beforehand had been predominantly male.

Early life and education
Kaitlyn (Katie) Savannah Steele was born in Murray, Utah. She is the daughter of Robyn Palmer and Matt Steele. Steele graduated from Southern Utah University in 2014 with a degree in elementary and special education.

Involvement in Model Rocketry

National Level
Steele began her involvement in model rocketry at age eleven. Her fellow competitors included her three siblings. Steele competed in her first NARAM in 2004 in The Plains, Virginia. In 2005, she competed in West Chester, Ohio. In 2006, she competed in Phoenix, Arizona and earned her first national title. She also placed first for her research and development report, entitled Experimental Determination of Drag Coefficients.  In 2007, she competed in Kalamazoo, Michigan, earning another first for her research and development report, A Comparison of Parachute Descent Rates. In 2008, the competition was again in The Plains, Virginia, where Steele earned her second national title. In 2009, the competition moved to Johnstown, Pennsylvania, where Steele placed fourth for her research and development report on simulator accuracy of low-powered models, and Steele earned her third national title in the 2010 competition in Pueblo, Colorado. She also placed second for her research and development report on developing a piston for cluster engine models. In 2011, Steele placed second in the national meet, behind her younger sister. Earlier that year, Steele and her two sisters competed in the Team America Rocketry Challenge in Washington D.C., though they did not place in the competition. Steele currently holds three national records in events A Cluster Altitude (2008), D Eggloft Altitude (2008), and F Streamer Duration (2009).

International Level
Steele's international career began in 2010. During the summer 2009, fly-offs were held for members of the NAR who want to be part of the International Team at the 18th World Space Modeling Championships. Steele was invited to become a member of the United States World Space Modeling Team, and compete in Vldnik, Serbia in early September 2010, despite not having formally competed for the team. Steele placed 11th in S5 Scale Altitude, though she had the highest recorded altitude in the event. In 2011, Steele was invited to return to the International Team as an assistant team manager, alongside Quest Aerospace's Bill Stine for the junior World Space Modeling Championships team in the 2012 competition in Liptovsky-Mikulas, Slovakia. Steele reprised her position as team manager at the FAI European Championships in Varna, Bulgaria in 2013, as well as in the FAI European Championships in Lviv, Ukraine in 2015, but was unable to return to the FAI World Space Modeling Championships in Lviv, Ukraine in 2016 due to scheduling conflicts.

National Event Awards

References

External links 
 Katie Savannah Steele on Twitter

Model rocketry
1992 births
Living people